"The Seeker" is a song written and recorded by American country music artist Dolly Parton. It was released as the first single from Parton's 1975 album, Dolly, and was also a top ten single on the U.S. country charts.  A spiritual, which Parton described as her "talk with God", the song was released as a single in July 1975, just missing the top spot on the U.S. country singles chart; it peaked at #2.

Two decades later, Parton rerecorded the song for her 1995 album Something Special. Nelly Furtado covered this song for the film The Year Dolly Parton Was My Mom. Merle Haggard who, in his 1981 autobiography, Sing Me Back Home, would confess his infatuation with Parton, also recorded the song. The British band The New Seekers recorded a version of the song in 1976.

Chart performance
Weekly

Year-End

References

External links
The Seeker lyrics at Dolly Parton On-Line

1975 singles
1975 songs
Dolly Parton songs
RCA Records singles
Songs written by Dolly Parton
Song recordings produced by Bob Ferguson (musician)